Heigi is a village in Hiiumaa Parish, Hiiu County in northwestern Estonia.

The village is first mentioned in 1688 (Heike, or Heicke, or Heiki). Historically, the village was part of Lauka Manor.

1977–1997 the village was part of Kurisu village.

References
 

Villages in Hiiu County